Roman Tolochko (born 25 October 1998) is a Ukrainian professional footballer who plays as a midfielder.

Career
Tolochko is a product of the Karpaty Lviv School Sportive System.

He made his senior debut for FC Karpaty against FC Lviv on 3 March 2019 in the Ukrainian Premier League.

Personal life
His father, Roman Tolochko, is a retired football player.

References

External links

1998 births
Living people
Sportspeople from Lviv
Ukrainian footballers
Association football defenders
Ukrainian Premier League players
Ukrainian First League players
FC Karpaty Lviv players
FC Kalush players
FC Metalist 1925 Kharkiv players
FC Kramatorsk players
FC Prykarpattia Ivano-Frankivsk (1998) players